The Lingdingyang Bridge was proposed by former Zhuhai prefecture mayor in the late 1980s to link Zhuhai and Hong Kong at Qi'ao and Tuen Mun, across the Lingdingyang, Pearl River estuary.

Preliminary works had been finished to link mainland Zhuhai with Qi'ao island.  Nonetheless the proposal was dropped to give way to a later proposal of Hong Kong-Zhuhai-Macau Bridge, which links Hong Kong at Lantau, and connects Macau as well.

In November 2019, Zhuhai government announced plans for a Shenzhen-Zhuhai bridge, officially named the Lingdingyang Bridge, as the bridge cross the Lingding Channel will be built to connect the two cities. The cross-sea section of the bridge is planned to be both an expressway and a railway. A two-way eight-lane expressway and a four-lane railway with a designed speed of  have been planned.

References

Bridges in Hong Kong
Transport in Guangdong
Pearl River Delta
Proposed bridges in China